Robert E. Coulson (May 12, 1912 – January 11, 1986) was an American politician and lawyer.

Background
Coulson was born on a farm in Grayslake, Illinois. He received his bachelor's degree in 1933 from Dartmouth College and his J.D. degree from University of Chicago Law School. Coulson served in the United States Army during World War II and was commissioned a captain. He spent 10 months in China in charge of the X-2 Counter Espionage Branch for the Office of Strategic Services, leaving the army with the rank of major.

He lived in Waukegan, Illinois with his wife and family. Coulson practiced law in Waukegan. Coulson was assistant state's attorney for Lake County and was in charge of juvenile matters for the county.

He served as mayor of Waukegan from 1949 to 1957. Coulson served in the Illinois House of Representatives from 1957 to 1962. Coulson was a Republican. He then served in the Illinois Senate from 1963 until 1973. Coulson also was a writer.

He died at Victory Memorial Hospital in Waukegan, Illinois.

Notes

External links

1912 births
1986 deaths
People from Grayslake, Illinois
People from Waukegan, Illinois
Military personnel from Illinois
Illinois lawyers
Writers from Illinois
Dartmouth College alumni
University of Chicago Law School alumni
Mayors of places in Illinois
Republican Party members of the Illinois House of Representatives
Republican Party Illinois state senators
20th-century American politicians
20th-century American lawyers
People of the Office of Strategic Services
United States Army personnel of World War II